Fimleikafélag Hafnarfjarðar, commonly referred to as FH, is an Icelandic multi-sports club based in Hafnarfjörður. The club competes in football, handball, athletics, and fencing. It was founded in 1929 as a gymnastics club but soon started a handball department which became its flagship for several decades. Its men's football team has been a dominant power since the early 2000s.

Football

Men's football

FH's men's football team  has been a dominant power in Icelandic football since the early 2000s, winning several national championships.

Women's football

FH's women's football team won the first edition of the national championship in 1972. After losing the title to Ármann in 1973, FH won three successive titles in 1974, 1975 and 1976. The club was promoted from the second-tier 1. deild in 2015, and finished sixth in the 2016 Úrvalsdeild.

Handball

Men's handball

Titles
 Icelandic champions
 Winners (16): 1956, 1957, 1959, 1960, 1961, 1965, 1966, 1969, 1971, 1974, 1976, 1984, 1985, 1990, 1992, 2011
 Icelandic Men's Handball Cup
 Winners (6): 1975, 1976, 1977, 1992, 1994, 2019
 1. deild karla
 Winners (1): 2008
 2. deild karla
 Winners (1): 19891
1 Won by the reserve FH-b

Women's handball

Titles
 Icelandic champions
 Winners (3): 1961, 1981, 1982
 Icelandic Women's Handball Cup
 Winners (1): 1981
 1. deild kvenna
 Winners (3): 1973, 20021, 20031
1 Won by the reserve FH-b

References

External links
 Official website

 
Multi-sport clubs in Iceland
1929 establishments in Iceland
Sport in Hafnarfjörður
Sports clubs established in 1929